The Ireland cricket team visited the United States in December 2021 to play three One Day International (ODI) and two Twenty20 Internationals (T20I) matches at Central Broward Park in Florida. It was the first time the United States was to host a full series with a Test nation, and the first time since 1973 that the Ireland cricket team have visited the US. Following the matches in the United States, the Ireland team then toured the West Indies for a three-match ODI series. 

The United States recovered from 16/4 in the first T20I to reach 188/6. Ireland were unable to chase down the target, resulting in a 26-run win for the Americans. The visitors levelled the series with a 9-run win in the second T20I, with Lorcan Tucker scoring his second half-century of the series.

A practice match, scheduled to be played on 20 December 2021, was cancelled due to COVID-19 issues within the squads. The first ODI was cancelled after a match official tested positive for COVID-19 and other officials were deemed close contacts. On 28 December 2021, the remaining ODI matches were each moved back by one day after a number of positive COVID-19 tests in the traveling parties, before the series was ultimately cancelled. The curtailment of the series resulted in financial losses for USA Cricket, contributing to its year-end debt load.

Squads

Josh Little was initially left out of Ireland's T20I squad due to his participation in the 2021 Lanka Premier League. However, on 17 December 2021, he was recalled to the team. Ahead of Ireland's departure to the United States, Craig Young was identified as close contact of someone with a positive COVID-19 case. Therefore, per Northern Irish travel guidance, Young was unable to travel for ten days, ruling him out of the T20I matches. Kyle Phillip was named as a reserve player for the United States.

Ahead of the series, the United States made several changes to their squad. Karima Gore, Jaskaran Malhotra and Aaron Jones were all ruled out of the T20I matches due to COVID-19, while Rusty Theron was ruled out due to a groin injury. They were replaced by Ritwik Behera, Yasir Mohammad, Ali Sheikh, and Ryan Scott in their T20I squad, and Kyle Phillip withdrew due to work commitments. Marty Kain was added to the ODI squad, and Sushant Modani was added to the T20I squad.

T20I series

1st T20I

2nd T20I

ODI series

1st ODI

2nd ODI

3rd ODI

References

External links
 Series home at ESPN Cricinfo

2021 in Irish cricket
2021 in American cricket
International cricket competitions in 2021–22
Irish cricket tours abroad
Cricket events curtailed due to the COVID-19 pandemic